Booster is a 2012 American crime drama film directed by Matt Ruskin, starring Nico Stone, Brian McGrail, Adam DuPaul, Kristin Dougherty and Seymour Cassel.

Cast
 Nico Stone as Simon
 Brian McGrail as Sean
 Adam DuPaul as Paul
 Kristin Dougherty as Megan
 Seymour Cassel as Harold
 Megan Hart as Kara

Release
The film premiered South by Southwest on 12 March 2012.

Reception
Joe Leydon of Variety called the film an "austere and stripped-to-essentials indie".

Ashley Moreno of the The Austin Chronicle wrote that while the film "lacks concrete resolution", it "offers an honest glimpse into the lives of good people navigating bad situations", and the "Well-placed banter between the male characters and quiet familial moments nicely temper the film's overall serious tone."

Tom Keogh of The Video Librarian rated the film 2 stars out of 4 and wrote that the "promising story is unfortunately lost in a monotonous succession of dreary moments involving the lighting of cigarettes or watching Sean fence stolen goods, when he isn't busy looking at the floor in a state of emotional repression."

References

External links
 
 

American crime drama films
2012 crime drama films